Michael Beaver Schoettle (born September 7, 1936) is an American sailor and Olympic Champion. He competed at the 1952 Summer Olympics in Helsinki and earned a gold medal as crew in the 5.5 metre class on the boat Complex II.

After his Olympic and Navy Careers, Schoettle worked in sales and marketing roles at Xerox. Later, he became an executive recruiter with Heidrick & Struggles. Using his years of experience in the industry, he wrote Career Change Guide, released first in 2021.

His brother Ferdinand Schoettle competed in sailing at the 1956 Summer Olympics, where he skippered a boat which finished 4th in the 5.5 metre class. The spinnaker was accidentally dropped in the last race, hence the 4th.

His grandfather, Edwin J. Schoettle, edited and published the book "Sailing Craft".

He graduated from The Lawrenceville School Yale University and Harvard Business School, and later taught at Loyola Marymount University.

References

https://www.olympic.org/michael-beaver-schoettle

External links
 
 
 

1936 births
Living people
American male sailors (sport)
Olympic gold medalists for the United States in sailing
Sailors at the 1952 Summer Olympics – 5.5 Metre
Medalists at the 1952 Summer Olympics
Yale Bulldogs sailors
Yale University alumni
Harvard Business School alumni
Loyola Marymount University faculty